John Henry Harmanson (January 15, 1803 – October 24, 1850) was a U.S. Representative from Louisiana.

Born in Norfolk, Virginia, Harmanson pursued classical studies and was graduated from Jefferson College, Washington, Mississippi.
He moved to Avoyelles Parish, Louisiana, in 1830 and engaged in agricultural pursuits.
He studied law.
He was admitted to the bar and practiced.
He served as member of the State senate in 1844.

Harmanson was elected as a Democrat to the Twenty-ninth, Thirtieth, and Thirty-first Congresses and served from March 4, 1845, until his death in New Orleans, Louisiana, October 24, 1850.
He served as chairman of the Committee on Expenditures in the Post Office Department (Twenty-ninth Congress).
He was interred in Moreau Plantation Cemetery, Pointe Coupee Parish, Louisiana.

See also
List of United States Congress members who died in office (1790–1899)

References

1803 births
1850 deaths
Jefferson College (Mississippi) alumni
People from Avoyelles Parish, Louisiana
Politicians from Norfolk, Virginia
Democratic Party members of the United States House of Representatives from Louisiana
19th-century American politicians